Paul Francis Little (14 September 1934 – 7 August 1993) was a New Zealand rugby union player. A centre, Little represented Auckland at a provincial level, and was a member of the New Zealand national side, the All Blacks, from 1961 to 1964. He played 29 matches for the All Blacks including 10 internationals. He was a member of the Auckland Marist Rugby Club.

References

1934 births
1993 deaths
Auckland rugby union players
New Zealand international rugby union players
New Zealand rugby union players
Rugby union centres
Rugby union players from Auckland